Layland v Ontario (Minister of Consumer and Commercial Relations) was a 1993 case brought towards the Ontario Divisional Court (Superior Court) after a same-sex couple was denied a marriage license at Ottawa City Hall.  The two applicants sued the Ontario Minister responsible for the issuing of marriage licenses and the federal government on the grounds that the acknowledged common law prohibition of same-sex couples from marriage violated their rights under the Charter at section 15 which prohibits discrimination based on "sex".1

In a 2-1 decision, judges of the Ontario Divisional Court dismissed the application for an order requiring the issue of a marriage licence, ruling "that under the common law of Canada applicable to Ontario a valid marriage can take place only between a man and a woman."

In the 2002 decision of the same Divisional Court, one judge referenced this previous decision, arguing it wasn't persuasive and was non-binding on the Court:

[116] In Layland, the court described the position of the province and the Attorney General of Canada as follows at p. 224:

The respondent Minister opposes the application on the ground that the applicants lack the capacity at common law to marry one another for the reason given by the City Clerk's Office.  The Minister takes no position on the alleged Charter violation, because capacity to marry is a matter within the exclusive legislative authority of the Parliament of Canada under Class 26 of s. 91 of the Constitution Act, 1867.  The Attorney General of Canada (the "Attorney General") opposes the application on the ground that the concept of marriage at common law is limited to persons of opposite sex and denies that such limitation violates s. 15 of the Charter.

The majority ruled that "persons of the same sex do not have the capacity to marry one another".
With respect, the decisions to which I have referred assumed, without analysis, that the inability of persons of the same sex to marry was a question of capacity.  The decisions are not binding on this court and, with respect, I do not find them persuasive. In my opinion, the fact that persons of the same sex may not legally marry is not a question of capacity.  Rather the inability of same-sex couples to marry results from the fact that, by its legal nature, marriage is a relationship which only persons of opposite sex may formalize.  The requirement that parties to a legal marriage be of opposite sex goes to the core of the relationship and has nothing to do with capacity."

Section Fifteen Charter case law
1993 in Canadian case law
Canadian law articles needing infoboxes
Canadian LGBT rights case law
Ontario case law
1993 in Ontario
1993 in LGBT history